In ancient Greek musical terminology the term epidiapente indicated an interval a perfect fifth higher. This meaning was also used by western European composers of the Renaissance, and can even be found as late as the Musical Offering of J.S. Bach. In that case, it was used in the 'Fuga canonica in epidiapente' to indicate that the second (unwritten) voice was to enter a fifth higher 

Fifths (music)